Bryan Rosenfeld (born 19 September 1965) is a Canadian retired professional soccer player and former Head Coach of the Canadian U-17 Women national soccer team.

Career
Rosenfeld played club football for Hamilton Steelers, and Toronto Blizzard. In 1993, he joined the Toronto Rockets and played two seasons with the organization. In 1995, he signed with Toronto Italia of the Canadian National Soccer League. He made his debut for the club on 5 June 1995 in a match against Scarborough Astros.

International career
Rosenfeld earned 1 cap for the Canadian national side in 1987. He also played for the Canada men's national under-20 soccer team and made his debut on 24 August 1985 against Nigeria in the 1985 FIFA World Youth Championship.

Managerial career 
In 2004, he serves as a goalkeeper coach under Frank Yallop for the Canada men's national soccer team. In 2008, he was named the head coach for the Canada women's national under-17 soccer team. and returned to that role in 2010.

References

External links

stats

1965 births
Living people
American Professional Soccer League players
Canada men's international soccer players
Canada men's youth international soccer players
Canadian soccer players
Canadian Soccer League (1987–1992) players
Hamilton Steelers (1981–1992) players
Sportspeople from Thunder Bay
Soccer people from Ontario
Toronto Blizzard (1986–1993) players
Toronto Rockets players
Toronto Italia players
Canadian National Soccer League players
Association football goalkeepers
London Lasers players
Winnipeg Fury players